Ricardo Jordan (born June 27, 1970) is a former Major League Baseball pitcher. He played parts of four seasons in the majors, from  until , for four teams. Jordan was strictly a relief pitcher during his career, making 69 career appearances. He won five games and his one MLB save came on July 31, 1995. He recorded the final out of the game, preserving a 6-3 Blue Jays victory over the Orioles.

Following his career, Jordan became involved with drugs, and in 2007 was sentenced to seven years in prison for drug trafficking.

References

External links

1970 births
Living people
Albuquerque Dukes players
American drug traffickers
American expatriate baseball players in Canada
American people convicted of drug offenses
American sportspeople convicted of crimes
Baseball players from Florida
Cincinnati Reds players
Columbus Clippers players
Dunedin Blue Jays players
Indianapolis Indians players
Knoxville Smokies players
Major League Baseball pitchers
Miami Dade Sharks baseball players
Myrtle Beach Hurricanes players
New York Mets players
Norfolk Tides players
Philadelphia Phillies players
Prisoners and detainees of Florida
Richmond Braves players
Scranton/Wilkes-Barre Red Barons players
Somerset Patriots players
Sportspeople from Boynton Beach, Florida
Syracuse Chiefs players
Toronto Blue Jays players